Thiotricha termanthes is a moth of the family Gelechiidae. It was described by Edward Meyrick in 1929. It is found in Assam, India.

The wingspan is about 10 mm. The forewings are pale ochreous with a rather dark fuscous stripe occupying the dorsal third from the base to the tornus, emitting from and near its apex two dark fuscous lines near and parallel to the termen, meeting the confluence of an oblique dark fuscous line from the costa at three-fourths and a short inwards-oblique mark just before the apex, the terminal edge is slenderly rose pink. There is a black apical dot. The hindwings are grey.

References

Moths described in 1929
Thiotricha
Taxa named by Edward Meyrick